Antonio Fernández-Rañada Menéndez de Luarca (1939 – 19 May 2022) was a Spanish theoretical physicist.

Biography
Antonio Fernández-Ramada was born in Bilbao. Soon after his birth, his family moved to Oviedo, where he spent his childhood and youth until he began his university studies in Madrid. He graduated in physics with a licentiate from the Complutense University of Madrid. In 1965 he graduated with a PhD from the University of Paris with a thesis on causality and the S-matrix. In 1967 he defended his habilitation thesis Propiedades analítica en la difusión pión-nucleón (Analytic properties in pion-nucleon diffusion) at the Complutense University of Madrid.

He was employed at the Centro de Investigaciones Energéticas, Medioambientales y Tecnológicas (CIEMAT), formerly named the Junta de Energia Nuclear (Nuclear Energy Board). He taught quantum mechanics at the University of Barcelona and theoretical physics at the Complutense University of Madrid. He was appointed professor by the Universidad de Zaragoza and held the chair of electromagnetism at the Complutense University of Madrid.

Fernánez-Rañada was the director of the Grupo Interuniversitario de Física Teóretica (GIFT). He was the founding editor and editor-in-chief for ten years of the journal Revista Española de Física.

He did research on the physics of elementary particles, nonlinear dynamics, topics in mathematical physics, the relation between topology and quantum electrodynamics, and some problems in cosmology. He also published articles on how science is related other fields of knowledge and to societal issues. He was the author of the 1990 book Dinámica clásica (Classical dynamics), a coauthor of the 1997 book  100 problemas de la Mecánica (100 problems of mechanics), and a coauthor of the 2-volume, 2007 book Física básica (Basic physics). He also wrote expository works on science and its wider implications: Los científicos y Dios, Los muchos rostros de la ciencia, De la agresión a la guerra nuclear — coauthored with J. Martín-Ramírez, Heisenberg. Ciencia, incertidumbre y conciencia, and Breves apuntes sobre la comunicación de la ciencia.

Awards and honors
 Research Prize in Physics from the Spanish Royal Academy of Sciences (1997)
 Medal of the Spanish Royal Physics Society (1985)
 Jovellanos International Essay Award (1994) for Los Muchos Rostros de la Ciencia
 Silver Medal of the Prince of Asturias (1999)
 President of the Principality of Asturias Council of Arts and Sciences
 President of the Spanish Royal Physics Society (2005-2010)
 Member of the Council of the European Physical Society
 Member of the Jury of the Princess of Asturias Award for Scientific and Technical Research

Selected publications

Articles

References

External links
 

1939 births
2022 deaths
20th-century Spanish physicists
21st-century Spanish physicists
Theoretical physicists
Complutense University of Madrid alumni
University of Paris alumni
Academic staff of the Complutense University of Madrid